Amy Tucker may refer to:

 Amy Tucker (game designer), designer of the collectible card game Xeko
 Amy Tucker (basketball), associate head coach of the Stanford Cardinal women's basketball team